Margaret Craven may refer to:
 Margaret Craven (politician) (born 1944), American politician in Maine
 Margaret Craven (writer) (1901–1980), American author
 Peggy Lloyd, formerly Craven (1913–2011), American actress